Hasan Ali Khan Garrusi (1820–1900), also known as Amīr(-e) Neẓām Garrūsī or Sālār-e Laškar, was an Iranian diplomat, officer, statesman, and literary figure of the Qajar period. He was born in Bijar to a Kurdish family from the Kabudvand tribe in 1820.

Biography 
Born in 1820 to a Kurdish family, his mother was a former concubine given to his father by the governor of Garrus Mohammad-Sadeq Khan as a favor. His father and grandfather were attached to the court of the crown prince of Tabriz. As part of his education, Hassan Ali Khan was taught Arabic and Persian composition, history, calligraphy and perhaps theology.

As part of the Garrus regiment, Hasan Ali  participated in the Herat campaign of 1837/38 and was later assigned to the Tabriz garrison and to pacify the Kermanshah region in 1841/42. He was then summoned to the capital and chose to leave Bijar for the Shah Abdol-Azim Shrine near Tehran following the suspicious death of his father. He was charged with patricide but the accession of Naser al-Din Shah Qajar to the throne opened new opportunities for Hasan Ali who was reinstated as commander of the Garrus regiment. He went on to become an important figure in quelling riots against the central government including the Salar revolt between 1847 and 1851.

He died on 5 Ramadan, January 1900. He was buried in the shrine of Shah Nimatullah Wali in Mahan.

See also
Amir Nezam House

References

Further reading 
 

Iranian diplomats
1820 births
1900 deaths
People from Kurdistan Province
Iranian Kurdish people
19th-century Iranian politicians
People of Qajar Iran